This is a list of members of the Western Australian Legislative Council between 22 May 2013 and 21 May 2017:

 North Metropolitan Labor MLC Ljiljanna Ravlich resigned on 10 March 2015. Martin Pritchard was elected in a countback on 21 April.
 South West Liberal MLC Nigel Hallett resigned from the Liberal Party on 16 June 2016 and joined the Shooters, Fishers and Farmers Party.
 North Metropolitan Labor MLC Ken Travers resigned on 29 August 2016. Laine McDonald was elected in a countback on 27 September 2016.
 East Metropolitan Labor MLC Amber-Jade Sanderson resigned on 5 February 2017 to contest the Legislative Assembly, while Agricultural National MLC Paul Brown and North Metropolitan Liberal MLC Peter Katsambanis resigned on 6 February 2017 for the same purpose. Sanderson and Katsambanis's vacancies were filled on 4 April 2017 by Bill Leadbetter and Elise Irwin respectively. Brown's vacancy was not being as the National Party gave notice to the Electoral Commissioner that there was no qualified member of that party available to fill the vacancy.

Members of Western Australian parliaments by term
Members of the Western Australian Legislative Council